Fred Roach or variants may refer to:
Fred Roach (1856–1922), Anglican bishop in South Africa
Freddie Roach (born 1960), American boxing trainer and a former professional boxer
Freddie Roach (organist) (1931–1980), American soul jazz musician
Freddie Roach (American football) (1983–present), former football player and current coach